Line 3 of the Tianjin Metro  a rapid transit line running from north-east to south-west Tianjin. It was opened on 1 October 2012. The line is 33.7 km long and has 26 stations of which 8 are elevated and the rest are underground.

Opening timeline

Stations (southwest to northeast)
OSI: Out-of-station interchange

References

Tianjin Metro lines
750 V DC railway electrification
2012 establishments in China
Railway lines opened in 2012